James 'Jim' Jennewein is an American screenwriter, author, teacher and writer, best known for writing several major Hollywood comedies of the 1990s, including the feature film adaptation of The Flintstones. He collaborates with Tom S. Parker.

Career
Jennewein graduated from the University of Notre Dame, and worked as a copywriter in advertising before becoming a screenwriter. With fellow copywriter Parker, the duo wrote Stay Tuned on spec. Within two days, the pair had signed with the Bauer Benedek agency and sold it for $750,000.

With Parker, Jennewein wrote the first draft of the film version of Super Mario Bros., which was a comedic fairy tale, focusing on Mario and Luigi attempting to rescue a princess named Hildy from Koopa. On The Flintstones, their most commercially successful project, they were part of a record 35 writers attached to the project before it was shot. Conversely, Ri¢hie Ri¢h underperformed at the North America box office, making back less than its $40 million budget, but made $125 million in VHS rentals.

In 2008, he partnered with Parker and together they wrote their first novel, Runewarriors: Shield of Odin, which is based on Norse mythology.  The Runewarriors series was continued with 2010's Sword of Doom and 2011's Ship of the Dead. He taught screenwriting at CSU Northridge, and is currently a professor at Fordham University, teaching screenwriting and TV Drama.

Film credits
Stay Tuned (1992) - screenplay, story
Ri¢hie Ri¢h (1994)
Getting Even with Dad (1994) - associate producer, writer
The Flintstones (1994) 
Major League II (1994) - story
A Mighty Wind (2003) actor (as James Jennewein)— Witch #3

References

External links 

Living people
University of Notre Dame alumni
Fordham University faculty
21st-century American novelists
Screenwriters from New York (state)
American male screenwriters
American male novelists
Screenwriting instructors
Year of birth missing (living people)
21st-century American screenwriters
21st-century American male writers